Neuromuscular Therapy (NMT) is an approach to soft tissue manual therapy.  It has been shown to be effective in the treatment of many conditions, although not all pathologies have shown treatment effects which persist over time.

References 

Massage therapy
Osteopathic manipulative medicine